This is a list of settlements in Northumberland by population based on the results of the 2011 census. The next United Kingdom census will take place in 2021. In 2011, there were 14 built-up area subdivisions with 5,000 or more inhabitants in Northumberland, shown in the table below.

Population ranking

See also 

 Northumberland

References

External links
 ONS Census website

 
Northumberland-related lists
Northumberland